Šimić is a surname found mainly among the Croats, but sometimes also among the Serbs. It may refer to:

Ana Šimić, Croatian athlete
Andrijica Šimić, Croatian folk hero
Antun Branko Šimić, Bosnian Croat poet
Dario Šimić, Croatian footballer
Josip Šimić, Croatian footballer, brother of Dario
 
Petar Šimić, Croatian Yugoslav admiral
Tatjana Šimić, Dutch-Croatian model and actress

See also 
 Šime
 Simić

Croatian surnames
Serbian surnames
Surnames from given names
fr:Šimić
it:Šimić
pl:Šimić